Greatest Hits is the first greatest hits compilation album released by British boy band Take That.

Background
Following the departure of Robbie Williams, Take That started touring as a four-piece until the announcement of their split on 13 February 1996.

The greatest hits compilation was released by RCA Records on 1 March 1996, and contained their final single, a cover of the Bee Gees' "How Deep Is Your Love", which became their final number one hit on the UK Singles Chart before their reunion in 2005.

The album reached number one in the UK, Ireland, Germany, Spain, Austria, Italy, Denmark and the Netherlands. The compilation was re-released in 1998 and 2004. The album was the 8th best selling of 1996 in the UK, and has been certified 3× Platinum in the UK.

The album re-entered the Irish Albums Chart after Take That performed the Irish leg of their Circus Tour on 13 June 2009, in Dublin. The album also returned on the Danish Albums Chart in 2011 at number eleven after the band's Danish leg of their Progress Live tour.

Track listings

Personnel
Gary Barlow – songwriter, vocals, producer
Howard Donald – vocals
Jason Orange – vocals
Mark Owen – vocals
Robbie Williams – vocals
Morgan Penn – artwork and design
Philip Ollerenshaw - photography

Charts

Weekly charts

Year-end charts

Decade-end charts

Certifications

Release history

References

1996 greatest hits albums
Take That albums
RCA Records compilation albums